José Cardoso Sobrinho  (born 30 June 1933, in Caruaru) is the Archbishop Emeritus of the Roman Catholic Archdiocese of Olinda e Recife in the Brazilian state of Pernambuco. 

He joined the Order of Our Lady of Mount Carmel in 1957 and was appointed bishop of Paracatu in 1979. Sobrinho is the successor of Hélder Câmara and had been tasked with undoing the influence of liberation theology in that region of Brazil.

2009 statement of excommunication

In March 2009, after an abortion on a nine-year-old girl raped by her stepfather and pregnant with twins had been performed due to rape exception of Brazil’s abortion laws, Sobrinho stated that automatic excommunication had been incurred by the girl's mother and the medical team. Regarding his statement, he said:

President Lula da Silva and Health Minister José Gomes Temporão decried his statement. The National Conference of Bishops of Brazil disowned it, saying that the mother was certainly not excommunicated and there was insufficient evidence to show that any member of the medical team was. The statement was also criticized in the Vatican newspaper L'Osservatore Romano by the President of the Pontifical Academy for Life, Cardinal Rino Fisichella. One of the doctors concerned said the controversy had drawn needed attention to Brazil's restrictive abortion laws.

Retirement

Sobrinho's resignation was accepted when he reached the canonical age limit upon turning 75 in 2008.

References 

1933 births
2009 in Brazil
21st-century Roman Catholic archbishops in Brazil
Carmelite bishops
Living people
People from Caruaru
20th-century Roman Catholic archbishops in Brazil
Roman Catholic archbishops of Olinda e Recife